Jean David-Weill (27 February 1898 – 30 May 1972) was a 20th-century French epigrapher, curator and collector.

The son of David David-Weill, he graduated in law and was a pupil of Gaston Migeon at the École du Louvre and later of Raymond Kœchlin. He followed the couses of Gaston Wiet at the École des langues orientales.

He married Anne David-Weill, a grand-daughter of Horace Günzburg.

In 1927 he was attached then resident at the Institut Français d'Archéologie Orientale at Cairo.

He held the chair of Muslim art at the École du Louvre in 1937 and was curator of the Oriental antiquities department of the Louvre en 1945.

Publications 
 Papyrus arabes du Louvre, 1971.
 Têtes de chevaux sassanides, 1954.
 Le Djami, d'Ibn Wahb: edited and commentated by J. David-Weill. II. Commentaire. 1er fascicule, 1941.
 Le Djâmi''', Volumes 1 à 2, 1941.
 Le Djâmi d'Ibn Wahb, 1939.
 Jean David-Weill, Henry Corbin, Remy Cottevieille-Giraudet, Eustache de Lorey and Georges Salles, Bibliothèque nationale. Les Arts de l'Iran, l'ancienne Perse et Bagdad, 1938.
 Époques mamlouke et ottomane, 1936.
 Les bois à épigraphes jusqu'à l'époque mamlouke: Musée National de l'art arabe. Ministère de l'instruction, publique, Volume 2, 1936.
 Un nouveau titre de propriété daté, 1935.
 Catalogue général du Musée arabe du Caire: les bois à épigraphes jusqu'à l'époque mamlouke, 1931.
 Papyrus arabes d'Edfou, 1931.
 Jusqu'à l'époque mamlouke, 1931.
 Université de Paris. Faculté de droit. Des comptes spéciaux du trésor et des infractions aux principes de la comptabilité publique qu'on y relève. Thesis for the doctorate, 1923.
 Des comptes spéciaux du Trésor et des infractions aux principes de la comptabilité publique quʹon y relève, 1923.
 Lettres à un marchand égyptien du IIIe au IXe 
 Quelques textes épigraphiques inédits du Caire 
 Une page de traditions sur papyrus du IIIe de l'hégire 
 Deux pages d'un recueil de hadith 
 Contrat de travail au pair: Papyrus - Louvre - 7348 
 Emendanda''

References

External links 
 Jean David-Weill. — Coupe d'argent de style sassanide on Persée
 Dictionnaire des orientalistes de langue française

Art collectors from Paris
1898 births
1972 deaths
Officiers of the Légion d'honneur
French art historians
Curators from Paris
French epigraphers
École du Louvre alumni
Lazard family
Members of the Institut Français d'Archéologie Orientale